The Dyirbalic languages are a group of languages forming a branch of the Pama–Nyungan family. They are:
Dyirbalic proper: Dyirbal, Warrgamay
Nyawaygic: Wulguru, Nyawaygi

At least one of the Lower Burdekin languages, Yuru, may belong to the Nyawaygic branch.

References

External links 
 Bibliography of Dyirbalic people and languages resources, at the Australian Institute of Aboriginal and Torres Strait Islander Studies